Putten is a municipality and town in the province of Gelderland, Netherlands. It had a population of 
It is located in the coastal area of the old Zuiderzee (Southern Sea). To the east of Putten lies the Veluwe, the biggest national park of the Netherlands. To the north, east and west, Putten is surrounded by farmlands.

Population centres

History

Until World War II

The oldest official paper in which Putten is mentioned dates back to 855. Small settlements, however, were already in existence during the Roman era. After the founding of the present main church in the 10th century, the community became the center of several smaller settlements. Parts of Nijkerk and Voorthuizen also became part of the Putten area, until in 1530 Nijkerk, and later also Voorthuizen, became independent communities.

Until 1356, when a dyke was built, the coastline changed frequently, overflowing agricultural land in the west of Putten. The water was still a threat however, and the dyke broke through several times. The last major flood was in 1916, when large parts of Putten were flooded. After the Afsluitdijk was built in the north of the Netherlands, the Zuiderzee became a lake (1927-1933) and no longer posed a threat.

Agriculture has always been a major source of income in Putten. The manufacturing of paper was also important in the 17th to 19th centuries. From the end of the 19th century tourism emerged, helped by the arrival of the railway in 1863. This made it easier for people from other towns to holiday in the boarding houses that Putten had built. Among those people from elsewhere were also patients who suffered from tuberculosis and similar diseases. They benefited from the sunlight and clean air and recuperated in several sanatoria.

Putten has suffered considerably from military violence. During the 15th, 16th and 17th century Putten was burned down on at least five occasions.

World War II 

One of the biggest Nazi raids held in the Netherlands during World War II took place in Putten.  On 1 and 2 October 1944, the majority of the male population was deported from the town and most of them died in concentration camps such as Neuengamme and Birkenau.  Following the war, two of the responsible German officers were tried and convicted for this action.  The raids were a retaliation for an attack by the local resistance that killed one Wehrmacht officer near Nijkerk.  The first and second of October are commemorated every year in Putten. A war memorial at Putten Church and a memorial garden (Vrouwtje van Putten Herdenkingshof) commemorate the event and the loss of life.

Economy

Today agriculture is still important in Putten, but the service sector now predominates. There are considerable numbers of shops, and tourism is important. Tourists are attracted by the varied landscape and the beach at the Ring Lake (Strand Nulde). Every Wednesday there is a produce and food market that is the biggest in the northwest Veluwe area.

Transport

Putten lies next to the A28 highway that connects Utrecht with the north. The town has a train station on the line between Utrecht and Zwolle. There are also bus connections.

Notable people 

 Hendrik van Boeijen (1889 in Putten – 1947), politician
 Danielle Goldstein (born 1985), American-Israeli show jumper, lives in Putten
 Ummet Ozcan (born 1982 in Putten), Dutch–Turkish DJ and record producer 
 Sander Duits (born 1983 in Putten), footballer with about 400 club caps who plays for SDC Putten

Gallery

References

External links 
 
Website Stichting Oktober 44 (war crime)

 
Municipalities of Gelderland
Populated places in Gelderland